is a Japanese AV idol, model, actress and idol singer. Boasting one of the longest and most prolific careers in Japanese pornography, Hatano has made appearances in over 3000 adult films so far, thus making her one of the most popular and recognizable faces in AV. Her popularity crossed over into mainstream entertainment (with appearances in theatrical films) and international territories as well, earning her the nickname "Sekai no Hatano" ("The World's Hatano"). As of 2019 she is represented by the AV agency T-Powers. She was also a member of the idol group T♡Project.

Life and career
Born on May 24, 1988 in Tokyo but raised in Kyoto, Hatano made her debut in the adult industry in 2008, when she first appeared in Amateur Or More ZERO, Less Than Actress 07 on July 3, 2008, under the Zero label of the AV company Prestige which specialized in finding and introducing amateur girls into the industry. Prior to performing in adult films, she had graduated from a cosmetology school, and had initially thought of becoming a gravure idol. However the competitive and low-paying world of gravure forced her to look for a more lucrative career which happened to be performing in adult films.

Hatano's first releases were on a monthly schedule under the Prestige, h.m.p. and Befree labels, however her popularity began to quickly rise and she began to appear at other companies like Attackers, Moodyz and Soft on Demand as well. Due to her matured looks she has often been cast into jukojo (housewife) or "older sister" type roles. She also became known for her flexible role-playing and willingness to appear in more hardcore genres (simulated rape, lesbian roles and S&M). Hatano also regularly appears in ensemble cast AV's and maintains a close relationship with other actresses like Chihiro Hara, AIKA, Ai Uehara, Tomoda Ayaka and Ruka Kanae. Her most notable working relationship is her friendly rivalship with fellow popular AV idol Hibiki Ōtsuki. Their pair "HibiHata" is well known in the industry and they appeared in dozens of adult film since 2013. In 2014, she won the Best Actress award in the 2014 DMM Adult Awards.

Hatano's output and regular AV appearances only increased in time, and by 2019 she appeared in over 2400 AV's (including compilations). She also appeared in numerous uncensored porn scenes that were distributed outside of Japan, making her one of the more known Japanese porn stars in the West.

Hatano also became popular in Singapore and Taiwan, where she is regarded as a lookalike for the popular Taiwanese actress and model Lin Chi-ling. In a 2018 compilation of AV sales on Japanese e-commerce retailer FANZA, Hatano ranked first in the Top 10 digital downloads chart. She achieved the same feat in 2019 as well, with both at the physical and digital sales.

Hatano has had opportunities to work outside of the Japanese AV industry. She played a part in the 2013 movie Sou shen ji (Chinese: 搜神记, In Search of Spirits), a collection of short supernatural stories. She was also cast in a lead role in the 2015 Taiwanese film Sashimi (transliteration of "sashimi").

In addition, she dabbled in the music industry when she joined musical idol group me-me*, which also featured AV idols Shiori Kamisaki, Ruka Kanae, and Maika. They launched a crowdfunding campaign for their first album via Japanese crowdfunding website Campfire on November 1, 2015. me-me* held their final concert on March 20, 2016. Currently she's part of the idol unit T♡Project with Hibiki Ōtsuki and Ruka Kanae.

On August 26, 2015, Taiwan's EasyCard Corporation announced that Hatano was to be featured on their public transport payment cards. The corporation stated that two collectible versions of the card, featuring a fully clothed Hatano, would be released: a "devil" edition, and an "angel" edition. EasyCard's decision to feature the AV idol drew criticism in Taiwan from parents and women's advocacy groups, who were concerned over the use of an adult film star's image. Additional controversy formed when it was discovered that one of the card's images was previously used as the cover of one of Hatano's adult films. EasyCard ended up going ahead with the sale of the metro cards, which sold out its entire run of 15,000 cards overnight.

In 2017, Hatano made a guest appearance on the Taiwanese public television program Guess Who (Who is Coming to Dinner?). She was invited to learn more about the Hand Angel nonprofit, which provides sexual services for those who are physically disabled.

In gaming, Hatano has been the spokesperson for mobile games such as the Taiwanese RPG Shén guǐ huànxiǎng (God Ghost Fantasy) in 2014. She lent her voice and likeness to play a hostess in Yakuza Kiwami and in the remastered version of Yakuza 3 for the PlayStation 4.

Uncensored Japanese pornography

2009年
 Sky Angel Vol.93 : 波多野結衣（9月9日、Sky High Ent.）
 Sky High X-Collection Vol.4 : 波多野結衣（12月29日、Sky High Ent.）

2010年
 Sky Angel Blue Vol.28 (Blu-ray Disc) : KEI, 波多野結衣（1月13日、Sky High Ent.）
 Sky Angel Blue Vol.29 (Blu-ray Disc) : 波多野結衣, KEI（1月13日、Sky High Ent.）
 ヌルヌルでＥキモチ（6月10日、Caribbeancom）
 Sky Angel Blue Vol.39 (Blu-ray Disc) : 波多野結衣（7月13日、Sky High Ent.）
 美乳レフリーに反則技（7月15日、Caribbeancom）
 Encore Vol.7 : 波多野結衣（7月29日、Stage 2 Media）
 Sky High Premium Vol.7 (11月16日、Sky High Ent.)

2011年
 3D Catwalk Poison 04 (Dreamroom Productions)
 Gold fingers 2 : 25Girls
 If Yui Hatano were My Girlfriend
 Encore Vol.16 波多野結衣（1月21日、Stage 2 Media）
 波多野結衣 歡迎來到我的世界（一本道 052411_100)
 Encore Vol.28 波多野結衣 (EStage 2 Media)

2012年
 Bondage Woman Teacher ~Going down to be sex slave~
 Empire Vol.1 ~ 50 Bukkake & Creampie ~
 Dirty Minded Wife Advent Vol. 30
 Sky Angel Blue Vol. 87
 S Model DV 11
THE波多野結衣　ぶっかけ50連発！（3月1日、x1x）
欲しがる人妻　波多野結衣 (3月15日、x1x）
「イってもイってもまだ足りない！」2012/10/06
「思う存分！もっともっと波多野結衣」2012/11/28

2013年
 Bukkake Jukujo Vol. 7
 Internal Cumshots
 Kirari 59 All Extreme Ero Woman
 S Model DV 17
 S Model DV 23
 Sky Angel Blue Vol. 104
 SkyHigh Jukujo Premium Vol. 3
「真実の愛に隠された現実」2013/02/12

2014年
 Red Hot Jam Vol. 350
 Red Hot Fetish Collection ~120 Shots Cream Pies 4~
 Sky Angel Blue Concentrated
 Red Hot Fetish Collection ~Cleaning Fellatio 3~
「ヒメコレ 高級ソープへようこそ 波多野結衣」2014/03/26

2015年
 CATWALK POISON 138 (Dreamroom Productions)
 LaForet Girl 53 Obedient Wife
 Red Hot Jam Vol. 390
 Red Hot Fetish Collection Working Girls Collection Bukkake Digest
 ストリップ劇場 ぶっかけまな板本番ショー （4月4日、Caribbeancom）
 マンコ図鑑 波多野結衣（5月15日、Caribbeancom）
 波多野結衣のパイズリを我慢できたら生中出しファン感謝オフ会（5月15日、Caribbeancom）
 ペニスを欲しがるドMな他人妻（6月20日、Caribbeancom）

2016
 S Model 155
 S Model 158

References

External links 
  Official blog
 
Official Sou shen ji website
Official me-me* website

Japanese pornographic film actresses
Living people
1988 births